East Side Story is the debut studio album by American singer-songwriter Emily King. It was released by J Records on August 28, 2007, in the United States. Chiefly produced by Chucky Thompson, the album included five songs from her EP East Side Story Sampler (2006). East Side Story was nominated for a Grammy Award for Best Contemporary R&B Album at the 50th ceremony.

Track listing

 Notes
  signifies a co-producer

Charts

References

2007 debut albums
Emily King albums
J Records albums